Vibrations per hour (vph, VPH) is a mechanical timepiece specification. It is used to express the frequency of a watch movement. VPH describes the number of times that a vibrating timekeeping component completes a vibration cycle in 1 hour. More vibrations per hour yields higher timekeeping resolution, and usually indicates a higher precision mechanical movement.

See also
 Hertz (Hz)

References 

Clocks
Units of temporal rate